Simone Asselborn-Bintz (born 24 January 1966 in Esch-sur-Alzette) is a Luxembourgian educator and politician of the Luxembourg Socialist Workers' Party. She sat in the Chamber of Deputies from April to October 2018.

Biography 
Simone Bintz is the daughter of Aly Bintz and Micky Erpelding.

Asselborn-Bintz joined the Luxembourg Socialist Workers' Party in 2002. She was elected to the Sanem communal council in 2005, then became an échevine of Sanem in 2011 and was re-elected in 2017.

From April 17, 2018 to October 30, 2018, Asselborn-Bintz replaced  as a deputy of the Sud constituency. She was a member of the Public Accounts, National Education, Children and Youth and Environment Committees of the Chamber of Deputies.

References 

21st-century Luxembourgian women politicians
21st-century Luxembourgian politicians
Luxembourg Socialist Workers' Party politicians
Members of the Chamber of Deputies (Luxembourg) from Sud
1966 births
Living people